In military terms, 111th Division or 111th Infantry Division may refer to:

 111th Infantry Division (German Empire)
 111th Infantry Division (Wehrmacht)
 111th Division (Imperial Japanese Army)
 111th Division (People's Republic of China)
111th Tank Division (Soviet Union)

See also
 111th Regiment (disambiguation)
 111 Squadron (disambiguation)